Open All Night is a 1934 British drama film directed by George Pearson and starring Frank Vosper, Margaret Vines, Gillian Lind, Geraldine Fitzgerald and Michael Shepley. The screenplay concerns Anton, a Grand Duke who was forced to flee Russia after the 1917 revolution, and now works as the night manager at Paragon House, a London hotel, where he puts his life on the line to help somebody else.

Cast
 Frank Vosper as Anton  
 Margaret Vines as Elsie Warren  
 Gillian Lind as Maysie  
 Lewis Shaw as Bill Warren  
 Leslie Perrins as Ranger  
 Colin Keith-Johnston as Henry  
 Geraldine Fitzgerald as Jill  
 Michael Shepley as Hilary

References

1934 films
1934 drama films
1930s English-language films
British drama films
British black-and-white films
1930s British films